Zaskovci is a village in the municipality of Pirot, Serbia. According to the 2002 census, the village has a population of 68 people.
It lies north of Zavoj Lake, to the northeast of the town of Temska.

References

Populated places in Pirot District